Notable alumni and students of the University of California, Berkeley, United States, in the areas of arts and media. Alumni who also served as faculty are listed in bold font, with degree and year. Notable faculty members are listed at List of University of California, Berkeley faculty.

Architecture
 Ruth Bancroft – studied architecture for three years, graduating with a teaching certification in 1932; created the Ruth Bancroft Garden in Walnut Creek, California and is known for her extensive collection of plants and her xeric landscape design
 Kofi Bonner – earned a Master of City Planning and a Master of Architecture; known for the heading the redevelopment of the city of Emeryville, California; director of economic development; interim city manager for Oakland, California
 Jonathan Browning – interior designer
 Hans Hollein, M. Arch. 1960 – architect, awarded the Pritzker Architecture Prize in 1985
 Julia Morgan, B.S. 1894 – architect, designed the Hearst Castle for newspaper businessman William Randolph Hearst
 Eric Owen Moss, M. Arch. 1968 – architect, famous for his contributions in theory and practice in contemporary architecture
 Vladimir Ossipoff, B.A. 1931 – Russia-born "master of modern Hawaiian architecture"
 Sigrid Lorenzen Rupp, graduated 1966 – German-born architect in Silicon Valley
 Kathryn McCamant – credited with coining the English term "cohousing" and introducing the cohousing model to North America.
Kenneth Tsang – Hong Kong actor who graduated as an architect
 Takeo Uesugi – landscape architect, designer of Japanese gardens throughout the world
 Peter Walker, B.S. 1955 – landscape architect, commissions include the World Trade Center Memorial and the Sony Center in Berlin
 Bernard Zimmerman – modernist architect and longtime educator at the Cal Poly Pomona College of Environmental Design
 Ella Lillian Wall Van Leer – Architect, artist and women's rights activist. Also known as the First Lady of Georgia Tech

Books
 Amir Aczel, B.A. 1975, M.S. 1976 – popular mathematics writer, author of the bestseller Fermat's Last Theorem: Unlocking the Secret of an Ancient Mathematical Problem, former professor of history at Bentley College, Guggenheim Fellow in 2004
 Christopher Andersen, B.A. 1971 - journalist, magazine editor and author of 18 New York Times nonfiction bestsellers including the No. 1 books "The Day Diana Died" and "The Day John Died"
 Robert Baer (attended) – former CIA case officer, author of the memoir See No Evil (2003), which served as the basis of the movie Syriana (2005). George Clooney's Academy Award-winning performance is loosely based on Baer
 Mischa Berlinski, B.A. 1998 – novelist, author of Fieldwork (2007)
 Kate Braverman, B.A. 1971 – poet, novelist; author of Lithium for Medea and Palm Latitudes
 David Brock, B.A. 1985 – political author (The Real Anita Hill [1993], Blinded by the Right [2002], The Republican Noise Machine [2004])
 Theresa Hak Kyung Cha, B.A. 1973, B.A. 1975, M.A. 1977, M.F.A. 1978 – multimedia artist; author of Dictee (1982)
 Jeff Chang, B.A. 1989 – hip-hop journalist and political activist; author of Can't Stop, Won't Stop: A History of the Hip-Hop Generation (2005) (American Book Award)
 James Chapman, B.A. 1978 – novelist
 Beverly Cleary, B.A. 1938 – author of books for children and young adults
 Sara Davidson, 1962 – author
 Lucille Lang Day, B.A. 1971, M.A. 1973, Ph.D. 1979 - poet and author
 Tiffanie DeBartolo, B.A. 1992 – author of God-Shaped Hole and How To Kill A Rock Star, and writer/director of Dream for an Insomniac
 Philip K. Dick (attended) – science fiction author whose stories were made into the movies Blade Runner, Total Recall, Minority Report, Paycheck, Screamers and A Scanner Darkly
 Joan Didion, B.A. 1956 – writer, author of Slouching Towards Bethlehem (1968), The White Album (1979), and The Year of Magical Thinking (2005)
 Chitra Banerjee Divakaruni. Ph.D. 1984, writer, author of Mistress of Spices (1997), Sister of My Heart (1999) and The Palace of Illusions (2008).
 Robert Dunn, B.A. 1972 – novelist, publisher, musician. Author of Meet the Annas (2007) and Pink Cadillac (2002)
 Meg Elison, B.A. 2014 – novelist and essayist of feminist fiction and non-fiction; winner of the Philip K. Dick Award for The Book of the Unnamed Midwife, and Locus Award winner for "The Pill".
 Karen Joy Fowler, B.A. 1972 – writer, author of The Jane Austen Book Club (2004) (later made into a movie of the same name starring Maria Bello, Emily Blunt, and Kathy Baker)
 Jackson Gregory, B.L. 1906 – popular author of western and detective novels; many of his works were turned into movies between 1916 and 1944.
 Barbara Guest, B.A. 1943 – sole female member of the modernist New York School of poets; awarded the Frost Medal for Lifetime Achievement by the Poetry Society of America (1999)
 Christopher Kasparek, 1966 – author, translator
 Agnes Newton Keith, author/memoirist of seven books about British North Borneo, today Sabah, Malaysia before and during the Japanese Occupation of the 1940s; one book Three Came Home was made into the Hollywood movie of the same name starring Claudette Colbert playing Keith
 Maxine Hong Kingston, B.A. 1962 – author, Senior Lecturer, recipient of 1997 National Humanities Medal awarded by President of the United States Bill Clinton
 Harry Lawton, B.A. 1949 – novelist, author of Willie Boy: A Desert Manhunt (1960), later made into a movie, Tell Them Willie Boy Is Here, starring Robert Redford
 Jack London (attended 1896–1897) – novelist best known for The Call of the Wild, White Fang, and The Sea-Wolf; Martin Eden provides a fictional account of his time at Cal
 Bryan Malessa, B.A. 1999 – novelist, author of The Flight (2007) and The War Room (2011).
 Daniel Marcus, Ph.D. Mechanical Engineering – Science Fiction author
 Greil Marcus, B.A. 1967, M.A. 1968 – cultural and music critic; author of Mystery Train (1975) and Lipstick Traces (1989)
 Terry McMillan, B.A. 1986 – author of Waiting to Exhale [1992] (later made into a film of the same name starring Whitney Houston) and  How Stella Got Her Groove Back [1996] (later made into a film of the same name starring Angela Bassett)
 Dhan Gopal Mukerji – first successful Indian man of letters in the U.S.
 Frank Norris (attended 1890–1894) – novelist; author of McTeague (1899), which became the basis for the classic 1924 silent film Greed
 Viet Thanh Nguyen, B.A., Ph.D. 1997 - awarded Pulitzer Prize for the novel "The Sympathizer"
 Parker Palmer, Ph.D. 1970 – writer, author of The Courage to Teach (1997), Let Your Life Speak (2000), and A Hidden Wholeness (2004)
 Mary Pipher, B.A. 1969 – author, expert on culture and mental health; author of Reviving Ophelia: Saving the Selves of Adolescent Girls, which was a best seller for over three years; author of the New York Times best seller The Shelter of Each Other: Rebuilding Our Families to Enrich Our Lives
 John V. Robinson, B.A. 1995 – photographer and folklorist, 2006 Guggenheim Fellow, author of several books, including Spanning the Strait: Building the Alfred Zampa Memorial Bridge (2004)
 Anneli Rufus, B.A. 1981 – journalist and author of many books, including Party of One: The Loner's Manifesto
 Shawna Yang Ryan, B.A. 1998 – novelist, author of Water Ghosts (2009), Green Island (2016), professor at University of Hawaii, Manoa
 Louis Sachar, B.A. 1976 – author, Holes (1998), Sideways Stories From Wayside School series
 Mona Simpson, B.A. 1979 – novelist (Anywhere But Here, later made into a film of the same name starring Susan Sarandon and Natalie Portman), Guggenheim Fellow, professor at Bard College; biological sister of Steve Jobs (co-founder of Apple Computer)
 Rebecca Solnit, M. Jour. 1984 – author, cultural historian, and activist; books include Wanderlust: A History of Walking (2000) and River of Shadows: Eadweard Muybridge and the Technological Wild West (2003)
 Irving Stone, B.A. 1923 – novelist, Lust for Life[1934] (later made into an Academy Award-winning film of the same name starring Kirk Douglas as Vincent van Gogh) and The Agony and the Ecstasy (1961; later made into a film of the same name starring Charlton Heston as Michelangelo)
 Timothy Tau, B.S. 2004 - award-winning short story writer
 Steven L. Thompson, B.A. – novelist, author of The Wild Blue: The Novel of the U.S. Air Force
 William T. Vollmann, (attended) – novelist
 Shawn Wong, B.A. 1971 – novelist, author of American Knees (1995; made into the film Americanese, released in 2009)
 Yang Mu, Ph.D. 1971 - poet, essayist, translator of English poetry into Chinese, first Taiwanese winner of Cikada Prize and Newman Prize for Chinese Literature, Professor Emeritus of Comparative Literature at University of Washington, author of Hawk of the Mind
 Charles Yu, B.A. 1997 - renown science-fiction author and writer on TV shows such as ''Westworld and Here and Now

Comic strips
 Scott Adams, M.B.A. 1986 – creator of Dilbert
 Rube Goldberg, B.S. 1904 – cartoonist and namesake of Rube Goldberg machines, winner of the Pulitzer Prize in 1948(also listed in Pulitzer Prizes section)
 Stephan Pastis, B.A. 1989 – creator of Pearls Before Swine
 Matt Richtel, B.A. 1989 – co-author of the comic strip Rudy Park under the pen name "Theron Heir"; winner of the 2010 Pulitzer Prize for National Reporting, (also listed in Pulitzer Prizes section)
 Betty Swords, – cartoonist
 Adrian Tomine, B.A. 1996 – comic artist, Optic Nerve; regular illustrator for The New Yorker and other magazines

Fine art
 Gerald M. Ackerman, B.A. 1952 – art historian
 Bruce Ariss, B.A. 1934 – painter, muralist, writer, illustrator, editor as well as theater and set designer, amateur playwright and actor, and overall icon on the Monterey Peninsula
 Natalia Anciso, M.A. 2015 – visual and installation artist and educator
 John Baldessari – conceptual artist
 Melanie Cervantes, B.A. 2004 – artist, printmaker, and activist
 Enrique Chagoya, MFA 1987 – artist, printmaker, and professor at Stanford University
 Davi Cheng – visual artist
 Vittoria Chierici – artist
 Robert Colescott, B.A. 1949, M.A. 1952 – artist, educator, and first African American painter to have a solo exhibit at the Venice Biennale
 Warrington Colescott, B.A. 1942, M.A. 1947 – artist, educator, and professor emeritus at University of Wisconsin–Madison
 Jay DeFeo, B.A. 1950 – painter
 Claire Falkenstein, B.A. 1930 – sculptor, painter, print-maker and jewelry designer known for her large-scale abstract metal and glass sculptures.
Joseph Goldyne, B.A. – printmaker, painter
 Ester Hernandez, B.A. 1976 – visual artist
 Gilah Yelin Hirsch – multi-disciplinary artist
 Tom Holland – abstract artist
 Arthur Johnsen, B.A. 1974 – painter, especially of Hawaiiana
 Richard Keyes, M.A. Painting, 1958 – professor emeritus at Long Beach City College, after a 30-year career there teaching life drawing and painting
 Thomas Kinkade, B.A. – painter
 Thomas W. Lentz, M.A. 1978 – art historian
 Taro Masushio, B.A. – artist, writer
 Malaquías Montoya, B.A 1969 – artist and professor emeritus at UC Davis
 Hushidar Mortezaie – collagist and fashion designer
 Carole Doyle Peel, M.A 1964 – artist
 John Pollini, M.A. 1973, Ph.D. 1978 – art historian
 Favianna Rodriguez (attended) – artist, printmaker, and activist
 Alexa Sand, M.A. 1994, Ph.D. 1999 – art historian
 Louise Schatz, B.A. 1939 – Canadian-born Israeli artist and designer
 Lanette Scheeline graduated 1932 – wallpaper and textile designer
 Sarah Seager, B.A. 1982 – artist
Nancy Selvin, BFA 1969; MA, Ceramics, 1970 – sculptor
 Ai Weiwei – artist

Music
 Gregory Abbott – composer and musician; sang "Shake You Down", which reached No. 1 on 1986 Billboard chart
 Thüring Bräm, M.A. – composer
 Suzanne Ciani, M.A. 1970 – composer
 Les Claypool – bassist and singer of Primus
 Stewart Copeland – drummer of The Police
 Henry Cowell (attended 1914) – composer
 Marié Digby (attended) – singer-songwriter
 Adam Duritz (attended) – lead singer of Counting Crows
 Jewlia Eisenberg, B.A. 1998 – musician, co-founder of Charming Hostess
 John Fahey (attended, later transferred to UCLA) – guitarist, founder of Takoma Records
 Liz Harris, B.A. 2002 – singer-songwriter, Grouper
 Davey Havok (attended) – lead singer of AFI
 Susanna Hoffs, B.A. 1980 – lead singer of The Bangles
 Rob Hotchkiss, B.A. 1983 – Grammy winner, guitarist, founding member of Train
 Robert Hurwitz – C.E.O. of Nonesuch Records
 Ivan Ilić, B.A. 2001 – American pianist of Serbian descent based in Paris
 Andrew Imbrie, M.A. 1947 – composer
 Steve Jablonsky – film composer whose works include the scores to Michael Bay's Transformers films, Battleship, and Lone Survivor
 Stephan Jenkins, B.A. 1987 – lead singer and songwriter of Third Eye Blind
 Michael Kang – multi-instrumentalist for the jam band The String Cheese Incident
 Jonathan Kramer, Ph.D. 1969 – composer
 Phil Lesh (attended) – bass guitarist of the Grateful Dead
 Jimmy Lopez, Ph.D. 2012 – classical music composer
 Vladimir Lyubovny known as DJ Vlad, disc jockey
 Laura Mam, B.A. Anthropology 2009 - Cambodian singer-songwriter
 Ed Masuga, B.A. 2002 – singer, musician, and songwriter
 Raymond Pepperell - guitarist for Dead Kennedys
 Jade Puget, B.A. 1996 – guitarist of AFI
 Malvina Reynolds, Ph.D. 1938 (also B.A., M.A.) – folk/blues singer-songwriter
 Terry Riley, M.A. 1961 – composer
 Ralph Saenz, Ph.D., aka Michael Starr – lead singer of Steel Panther
 Angela Seo, member of Xiu Xiu
 Shing02 – underground Japanese hip hop artist; achieved mainstream notoriety in the United States primarily for his contributions to the Shinichiro Watanabe anime series Samurai Champloo
 Matt Wallace, B.A. 1982 - producer, composer
 LaMonte Young, (attended) – composer
 Charlie Yin, B.A. 2012 - Electronic music producer that performs under the name Giraffage

Newspapers and magazines
 Joan Acocella, B.A. 1966 – dance critic, The New Yorker
 John Battelle, B.A. 1987, M.Jour. 1992 – co-founder of Wired magazine
 Rod Beaton, an American journalist and media executive with United Press International
 Darrin Bell, B.A. 1997 - 2018 Pulitzer Prize for editorial cartooning

 Susan Berman, M.B.A. 1969 – author (Easy Street, Lady Las Vegas), newspaper reporter, magazine writer (New York)
 Sandra Blakeslee, B.A. 1965 – science writer and correspondent for The New York Times
 Max Boot, B.A. 1992 – conservative columnist and author
 Nina Fallenbaum, B.A. 2000 – food and agriculture editor of Hyphen magazine, writer, and activist
 Pauline Esther Friedman, (attended, class of 1938) – aka Abigail Van Buren ("Dear Abby")
 Michelle Goldberg, M.S. - book author and writer for The New York Times and The Nation magazine
 Paul Khlebnikov, B.A. 1984 – investigative journalist, first editor of Forbes in Russia and author of controversial book "Godfather of the Kremlin: Boris Berezovsky and the Looting of Russia"
 Joseph W. Knowland, B.A. 1953 – former publisher of the Oakland Tribune (1974–1977)
 William F. Knowland, B.A. 1929 – owner, editor and publisher of the Oakland Tribune (1966–1974)
 Wendy Lesser, M.A. 1977, Ph.D. 1982 – cultural critic; founding editor of The Threepenny Review
 Zuzana Licko, B.A. 1984 – co-founder of Emigre magazine and type foundry
Steve Linde (born 1960) - newspaperman 
 T. Christian Miller, B.A. 1992 – founding employee, ProPublica; writer at the Los Angeles Times
 Maureen Orth, B.A. 1964 – author and writer for Vanity Fair magazine
 Susan F. Rasky, B.A. 1974 – former reporter for The New York Times, journalism instructor at UC Berkeley, recipient of the George Polk Award

 Jennifer Rubin, B.A., J.D. - journalist, columnist, Washington Post
 Max Scherr, M.A. - journalist, founder and publisher of the Berkeley Barb
 Hugo Schwyzer – author, speaker and former instructor of history and gender studies
 Lincoln Steffens – one of the most famous practitioners of the muckraking journalistic style
 Steven L. Thompson, B.A. – journalist, columnist at Cycle World
 Adrian Tomine, B.A. 1996 – comic artist, Optic Nerve; regular illustrator for The New Yorker and other magazines
 Rudy VanderLans, B.A. 1984 – co-founder of Emigre magazine and type foundry
 Jann Wenner (attended) – founder of Rolling Stone magazine
 DeWitt Wallace - founder and editor-in-chief of Reader's Digest

Non-fictional broadcasting
 Margot Adler, B.A. 1968 – NPR correspondent, host of NPR's Justice Talking
 Robert Bazell, B.A. 1967 – NBC News Chief Science and Health Correspondent
 Roxy Bernstein, 1996 – California Golden Bears sports announcer
 Jeffrey Brown, B.A. – Senior Correspondent on the PBS news program The NewsHour with Jim Lehrer
 Peter Chernin, B.A. 1974 – president of News Corporation and CEO of the Fox Group-- 
 Corey Flintoff, B.A. 1970 – NPR Foreign Desk Correspondent and former host of NPR's All Things Considered
 Greg Gutfeld, B.A. 1987 – blogger and host of the late night talk show, Red Eye w/ Greg Gutfeld on the Fox News Channel
 Brianna Keilar, B.A. 2001 – graduated with Phi Beta Kappa in Mass Communication and Psychology; former MTV correspondent; currently a CNN correspondent
 Larry Josephson, B.A. 1973 – Public radio producer; former radio host for WBAI and KPFK
 Richard Lui, B.A. Rhetoric – journalist and news anchor for MSNBC; previously a news anchor for five years at CNN Worldwide
 Renée Montagne, B.A. 1973 – co-host of NPR's Morning Edition
 Kent Ninomiya, B.A. 1988 – TV news anchor (KSTP-TV), reporter, executive
 Suchin Pak, B.A. 1997 – MTV correspondent
 Troy Roberts, B.A. 1984 – CBS News correspondent
 Michael Savage, Ph.D. 1978 – conservative radio talk show host, Savage Nation
 Steve Somers, B.A. 1965 – WFAN overnight host
 Michele Tafoya, B.A. 1988 – sports television reporter for ABC Sports and ESPN
 Nicolle Wallace, B.A. - former White House Communications Director, book author and news program host for MSNBC
 Morgan Webb, B.A. 2000 – co-host of X-Play on G4
 Gwendolyn Wright, M.Arch. 1974, Ph.D. 1978 – co-host of popular PBS TV series History Detectives; professor of architecture, history, and art history at Columbia University; Guggenheim Fellow (2004–05)

Film, television, video games and theatre
 Yahya Abdul-Mateen II, B.A. 2008 - actor, best known for portraying David Kane / Black Manta in the DC Extended Universe superhero film Aquaman (2018) and Cal Abar in the HBO limited series Watchmen (2019)
 Margaret Armen, B.A - television script writer, including three episodes of the original Star Trek series
 George Azar, B.A. 1981 – press photographer and documentary filmmaker, specialising in Middle East coverage
 David Lee (photographer), B.A. 2004 – fashion and celebrity photographer
 Bill Bixby (attended) – director, actor (The Incredible Hulk)
 Amir Blumenfeld, B.A. 2005 – writer, comedian, actor and TV host
 Guy Branum, B.A. 1998 – head writer of X-Play
 Golden Brooks, B.A. 1994 – film and television actress
 John Cheng, B.A. 1996 – producer  Horrible Bosses, Mirror Mirror, Horrible Bosses 2, Barely Lethal
 John Cho, B.A. 1996, English literature – actor (American Pie, Harold & Kumar Go to White Castle, Star Trek, Better Luck Tomorrow)
 Jeff Cohen, B.S. 1996 – former actor (Chunk in The Goonies), currently entertainment lawyer
Michael Colleary, B.A. English 1982 - screenwriter and producer (Face/Off, Firehouse Dog, Professionals)
 Brett Dalton, B.A. 2005 – actor (Marvel's Agents of S.H.I.E.L.D.)
 Zubin Damania, aka ZDoggMD, B.S. 1994 – internet celebrity, hospitalist physician
 Ronald Davidson, B.A. 1921 – screenwriter, director, and producer from 1937 to 1966
 Roxann Dawson, B.A. 1980 – actress (B'Elanna Torres on the television series Star Trek: Voyager), director, author, playwright
 Camille de Casabianca, M.A. Political Science 1980 – screenwriter, director and novelist
 Ralph Edwards, B.A. 1935 – national television host and producer
 Syd Field, B.A. 1960 – author of the "bible of scriptwriters" 
 Carl Franklin, B.A. 1971 – film director (One False Move [1992], Devil in a Blue Dress [1995], High Crimes [2002], Out of Time [2003])
 Barbara Garson, B.A. 1964 - American playwright, author and social activist, best known for the play MacBird!
 Peter Gethers (attended 1970–1972) – screenwriter and author of bestselling Norton the cat trilogy
 Amos Gitai, Ph.D. (Architecture) 1986 – Israeli film director (Field Diary [1982], Eden [2001], Free Zone [2005])
 Mark Goodson, B.A. 1937 – television producer who specialized in game shows
 Karen Grassle, B.A. 1965  – actress, best known for her role as  Caroline Ingalls (the mother) on the Little House on the Prairie television series
 Harry Hamlin (transferred to Yale University) – actor, Clash of the Titans, L.A. Law
 Hannah Hart, B.A. (English literature and Japanese Language) 2009 – YouTube content creator and host of My Drunk Kitchen, actress in Camp Takota
 Edith Head, B.A. 1919 - Academy Award-winning costume designer
 Andrew R. Heinze, M.A. 1980, Ph.D. 1987 – playwright and historian
 Amy Hennig, B.A. – video game director (Uncharted trilogy) and writer 
 Barbara Holecek - documentary filmmaker 
 William Hung (attended) – contestant on American Idol
 Idil Ibrahim – director and producer; founder of Zeila Films
 Chris Innis, B.A. (Film) 1988 – film editor, American Gothic, The Hurt Locker, G.I. Jane (Associate Editor)
 Robbie Jones, (Class of 2000) – actor (One Tree Hill)
 Ashley Judd, currently doing PhD – actress (Ruby in Paradise, Divergent)
 Stacy Keach, B.A. 1963 – actor who portrayed Mickey Spillane's Mike Hammer in several films and received a Golden Globe nomination for in 1984, narrator of documentaries from National Geographic and Nova
 Adam Lamberg (Class of 2006) – actor (Lizzie McGuire)
 Sanaa Lathan, B.A. 1992 – actress (Blade [1998], Something New [2006]; Tony Award nomination [2004], Raisin in the Sun)
 Quentin Lee, B.A. 1992 – Asian-American film director (Shopping for Fangs [1997], Drift [2001], Ethan Mao [2004])
 Young Jean Lee, B.A. 1996, Ph.D. candidate 2000–2005 – OBIE Award-winning playwright and director of experimental theater
 Will Yun Lee, B.A. 1993, actor (The Wolverine)
 Christopher Maclaine, B.A. 1946, filmmaker and poet
 Johnny Manahan, B.A. 1969 – Filipino film and television director, writer, and actor; head executive of the training and management subsidiary of ABS-CBN Corporation, Star Magic
 Joshua Marston, B.A. 1990 – film director (Maria Full of Grace [2004])
 Quinn Martin, B.A. 1949 – television producer (The Fugitive, The Streets of San Francisco)
 Charles Martinet (attended) ‐ voice actor, current voice of Mario, Luigi, Wario, and Waluigi in the Super Mario series
 Jerry Mathers, B.A. 1974 – actor (Leave it to Beaver)
 Errol Morris (attended 1973–1975) – documentary film director (The Thin Blue Line [1988], Fog of War [2003])
 Barry Nelson, B.A. 1941 - stage and screen actor who was the first to portray James Bond in a television adaptation of Casino Royale
 Shirin Neshat, B.A. 1979, M.F.A. 1982 – Iranian-American filmmaker, video artist, and photographer; 1999 Venice Biennale First Prize Winner
 Sammy Obeid, degree in business and mathematics – stand-up comedian who has appeared on America's Got Talent and Conan
 Paula Patton (transferred to University of Southern California) – actress, Mission: Impossible – Ghost Protocol and Precious
 David Peoples, BA English – screenwriter (the Ridley Scott film Blade Runner and the Terry Gilliam film 12 Monkeys), nominated for the Academy Award for Best Screenplay for the Clint Eastwood film Unforgiven (which did win the Academy Award for Best Picture); collaborator with  Jon Else on the Academy Award-winning documentary Who Are the DeBolts? And Where Did They Get Nineteen Kids? and the Academy Award nominated documentary The Day After Trinity
 Gregory Peck, B.A. 1939 – actor, Academy Award winner and Golden Globe winner (To Kill a Mockingbird, Gentleman's Agreement, Roman Holiday, The Yearling, Twelve O'Clock High)
 Chris Pine, B.A. 2002, English literature – actor (Star Trek, Wonder Woman, Hell or High Water, The Princess Diaries 2, Smokin' Aces)
 Ed Quinn, B.A. 1991, History – actor (Eureka, 2 Broke Girls)
 Loren L. Ryder, 1924 – sound engineer; winner of five Academy Awards
Atsushi Sakahara MBA 2000 - Palme d'Or 2001(Associate Producer) and IDA short listed(Director/Producer) 
 James Schamus, B.A. 1982, M.A. 1987, Ph.D. 2003 – screenwriter and movie producer
 Elizabeth Sher, B.A. 1964, M.A. 1967 – documentary and short filmmaker and artist
 Brett Simon, M.F.A. 2002, Ph.D. 2003 – director, Assassination of a High School President
 Ryan Simpkins (attended) – actress (The House, Brigsby Bear)
 Randi Mayem Singer, B.A. 1979 – writer and producer, Mrs. Doubtfire, Jack and Jill
 Brenda Song, B.A. 2009 –  actress and model, (The Suite Life of Zack & Cody, The Suite Life on Deck)
 Gloria Stuart, studied philosophy and drama (enrolled 1928–1930); actress and artist, known for her roles in The Invisible Man (1933) and Titanic (1997)
 Timothy Tau, B.S. 2004 - filmmaker and screenwriter
 George Takei, (transferred to UCLA), actor, Star Trek, Star Trek: The Original Series
 Brian Tee, B.A. 1999 – actor
 Nancy Tellem, B.A. 1975 – president of CBS Paramount Television Network Entertainment Group
 Sophie Treadwell, B.Litt. 1906 – playwright, of most famously Machinal, and journalist
 Scott Trimble, B.A. 1999 – location scout and location manager (Transformers, Star Trek, Iron Man 2)
 Morgan Webb, B.A. 2001 – host of X-Play
 Audrey Wells, B.A. 1981 – screenwriter (The Truth About Cats & Dogs [1996]) and director (Under the Tuscan Sun [2003])
 Haskell Wexler (attended) – cinematographer, two-time Academy Award winner, and five-time nominee (Who's Afraid of Virginia Woolf, Bound for Glory and One Flew Over the Cuckoo's Nest)
 Timothy Wheeler, director, producer, cinematographer
 Aaron Woolfolk, B.A. 1992 – film director, screenwriter, The Harimaya Bridge
 Charles Yu, B.S. 1997 - screenwriter & TV writer of shows such as Westworld, Here and Now, Lodge 49, Legion, Sorry for Your Loss and Dream Corp, LLC

See also
 List of University of California, Berkeley faculty
 UC Berkeley School of Law

References

Arts and media
Berkeley alumni in arts and media
Alumni in arts and media